Emma Gilmour (born 30 September 1979) is a rally driver from New Zealand.

Early life 
Gilmour was born in Dunedin in 1979. Her father and maternal grandfather were both mechanics. Before taking up motor racing in her early 20s she was an equestrian representing Otago–Southland in eventing and participating in the New Zealand development squads.

Racing career 
A three-time New Zealand Rally Championship runner-up, she was signed by Veloce Racing as reserve driver for the inaugural season of the new electric off-road racing series Extreme E in 2021. She replaced regular driver Jamie Chadwick in two events. Gilmour moved to McLaren XE for the 2022 season, also becoming the first woman to race as a factory driver for McLaren. Partnering Tanner Foust, she achieved one podium finish at the season-ending Energy X-Prix.

Outside of racing, Gilmour runs a Suzuki car dealership in Dunedin.

Racing record

Complete Extreme E results
(key)

* Season still in progress.

References

Notes

External links
 Page on eWRC-results.com
 Emma Gilmour website

Living people
1979 births
New Zealand rally drivers
Sportspeople from Dunedin
World Rally Championship drivers
Extreme E drivers

McLaren Racing drivers